KSVC (980 AM) is a radio station broadcasting a talk format. Licensed to Richfield, Utah, United States, the station is currently owned by Douglas Barton, through licensee Sanpete County Broadcasting Company. KSVC is an affiliate of BYU sports.

References

External links

SVC